In enzymology, a N-carbamoyl-D-amino acid hydrolase is an enzyme that catalyzes the chemical reaction

N-carbamoyl-D-amino acid + H2O  D-amino acid + NH3 + CO2

Thus, the two substrates of this enzyme are N-carbamoyl-D-amino acid and H2O, whereas its 3 products are D-amino acid, NH3, and CO2.

This enzyme belongs to the family of hydrolases, those acting on carbon-nitrogen bonds other than peptide bonds, specifically in linear amides.

Structural studies

References

 

EC 3.5.1
Enzymes of known structure